The women's points race at the 2012 Dutch National Track Championships in Apeldoorn took place at Omnisport Apeldoorn on December 27, 2012. 19 athletes participated in the contest.

Competition format
There were no qualification rounds for this discipline. Consequently, the event was run direct to the final.

Race
The race started at 19:35 and consisted on 100 laps, making a total of 25 km.

Results

Results from nkbaanwielrennen.nl

References

2012 Dutch National track cycling championships
Dutch National Track Championships – Women's points race